Bryce Graeme Robins (born 12 December 1958) is a former New Zealand rugby union player. A wing, Robins represented Taranaki at a provincial level, and was a member of the New Zealand national side, the All Blacks, on the 1985 tour of Argentina. He played four matches on that tour but did not appear in any internationals.

References

1958 births
Living people
People from Eltham, New Zealand
People educated at New Plymouth Boys' High School
New Zealand rugby union players
New Zealand international rugby union players
Taranaki rugby union players
Rugby union wings
Rugby union players from Taranaki